Jenny May Blokland is a Judge of the Supreme Court of the Northern Territory.

Early life and education 
Blokland was born in Ardrossan, South Australia, one of two children of Joan and Frank Blokland. Her father was a boilermaker/fitter & turner while her mother was a legal secretary. Blokland went to school at Modbury High School in Adelaide before studying at the University of Adelaide, where she graduated with a Bachelor of Laws.

Career
To become a solicitor Blokland needed to complete a period as an articled clerk, which she did at the Northern Territory Department of Law in 1980-1, where she worked with Ian Barker . She then worked for the North Australian Aboriginal Legal Aid Service, until 1987, predominantly in criminal and family law. Blokland again studied at the University of Adelaide, obtaining a Master of Laws, before returning to the Northern Territory in 1990 where she became a lecturer at the Northern Territory University, in 1996 becoming the Dean of the Law Faculty. In December 1994 Blokland was also appointed as a part-time Judicial Registrar of the Industrial Relations Court of Australia.

Blokland worked at the Office of the Director of Public Prosecutions from 1998 until 2000 when she briefly practiced as a barrister. Blokland then worked at the Department of Justice as Director of Policy, before being appointed as a magistrate to the Magistrates court in 2002, becoming Chief Magistrate in 2006.

Supreme Court of the Northern Territory
Blokland was appointed to the Supreme Court on 9 April 2010 replacing Justice David Angel who retired in January 2010. Justice Blokland was the third female appointment to the Court since it was established in 1911, following the appointment of Sally Thomas in 1992 and Judith Kelly in 2009. Blokland's appointment to the Supreme Court alongside Justice Kelly meant that for the first time the Court had two females Judges.

References

People from Darwin, Northern Territory
Judges of the Supreme Court of the Northern Territory
Australian women judges
Living people
Year of birth missing (living people)